Constance Goddard DuBois (died 1934) was an American novelist and an ethnographer, writing extensively between 1899 and 1908 about the native peoples and cultures of southern California.

DuBois was born in Zanesville, Ohio, and settled in Waterbury, Connecticut, in 1889. Her published fiction included several short stories plus six novels (DuBois 1890, 1892, 1895a, 1895b, 1900, 1907).

DuBois' most enduring contribution was as a self-taught ethnographer, doing pioneering studies in a period when professional academic anthropology was just becoming established in the United States. Starting in the late 1890s, she made summer trips out west to see her sister who lived in the San Diego area. She began making treks into the San Diego backcountry, to meet the surviving communities of Diegueño and Luiseño Indians. Soon she was writing about their traditional and contemporary lifeways, promoting traditional crafts (particularly basketry), and helping with financial and political assistance.

DuBois' longest ethnographic work was a detailed monograph on "The Religion of the Luiseño Indians of Southern California" (1908), edited by Alfred L. Kroeber. In addition, she published 23 shorter articles about the region's native peoples, with particular emphases on their mythology, ceremonies, and crafts (Laylander 2004). Her manuscript papers are on file at Cornell University, and the San Diego Museum of Man has a collection of her photographs.

Works
Martha Corey: A Tale of the Salem Witchcraft. A. C. McClurg, Chicago, 1890.
Columbus and Beatriz. A. C. McClurg, Chicago, 1892.
The Shield of the Fleur de Lis: A Novel. Merriam, New York, 1895
A Modern Pagan: A Novel. Merriam, New York, 1895
A Soul in Bronze: A Novel of Southern California. H. S. Stone, Chicago, 1900.
"The Raven of Capistrano: A True Wonder Tale". Out West 26:430-437, 537-544, 27:57-64, 152-157, 227-233, 343-351, 415-421, 523-531 (1907).
"The Religion of the Luiseño Indians of Southern California". University of California Publications in American Archaeology and Ethnology 8:69-166 (1908).

References

Laylander, Don (editor). 2004. Listening to the Raven: The Southern California Ethnography of Constance Goddard DuBois. Coyote Press, Salinas, California, 2004.
Laylander, Don (editor). 2006. Early Ethnographic Notes from Constance Goddard DuBois on the Indians of San Diego County. Journal of California and Great Basin Anthropology 26:205-214.

External links

Year of birth missing
1934 deaths
American anthropologists
American ethnologists
American folklorists
American women anthropologists
Women ethnologists
Ethnographers
People from Zanesville, Ohio
Women folklorists